Thomas Reaney was a footballer who played three games at right-back in the Football League for Burslem Port Vale in the mid-1900s.

Career
Reaney played for Bridgetown Amateurs before joining Burslem Port Vale in August 1904. His debut came on 17 December; in a 2–1 defeat to Bolton Wanderers at the Athletic Ground. He played only a further two Second Division games before being released at the end of the season.

Career statistics
Source:

References

Year of birth missing
Year of death missing
English footballers
Association football fullbacks
Port Vale F.C. players
English Football League players